The Delaho Formation is a geologic formation dating from the Pliocene and Miocene in Texas. It preserves fossils.

See also

 List of fossiliferous stratigraphic units in Texas
 Paleontology in Texas

References

 

Geologic formations of Texas